Inquisição is a Brazilian hard rock and metal band, formed in 1983. Albums they have released are One More Battle and Reborn.

Band history
Founded in 1983 by the brothers Luiz F. Machado and João H. Machado, the band had several line-ups through its history. It all started with the name, chosen by João Machado who, after studying the Middle Ages, had a special interest in the Crusades, in the Knights Templar and in the Inquisition. The period which Silvio Mazzei and Roberto Moura (drums, former Dorsal Atlântica) joined the band marked the phase when Inquisição started to play very often in Rio de Janeiro, especially at Circo Voador and Caverna 2, the city's main Heavy Metal venues. They also recorded another demo with this line-up, with the songs Cruz de Ferro and Cães Malditos, at Estúdio Performance, which belonged to Daniel Cheese, producer and former guitarist of the band Água Brava. In 1987, the band recorded their third demo tape, again at Estúdio Performance, including the songs Tempo Fechado, Cruz de Ferro, Cães Malditos, Insano and Napalm. This tape had a good reception, and was sold in underground record stores in Brazil at the time.
 
Its songs were also played in metal radio shows such as Guitarras at Fluminense FM and Transmetálica at Transamerica FM, among others. It sold more than 2000 copies in Rio and São Paulo alone. After reviewing this demo, foreign magazines such as Kerrang (England) and Metal Hammer (Germany) considered Inquisição the best Brazilian new band of that time, and it was also covered by Brazilian magazines such as Rock Brigade (from São Paulo) and Metal (from Rio). It was also during this period that Luiz F. Machado and Silvio Mazzei became the band main songwriters, a partnership kept until today. All Inquisição songs have been written by them. In 1989 the band performed their final gig, with Jaime de Moraes on the drums, on a show with Dorsal Atlântica. In 2001, the demo was printed as a bootleg LP, which was sold all over the world. Because of the promotion of this bootleg, heavy metal websites, such as Germany's Encyclopedia Metallum, started having Inquisição pages, telling the band's history up to that year, 1987. Silvio Mazzei got a copy of this bootleg, and after some talks, the band decided to get back together after a 17-year break.
 
So in 2008, One More Battle, the band’s first official album was released. After some very positive reviews around the world, the band got the chance to be the supporting act for Deep Purple on February 22, 2008 at the Citibank Hall, Rio de Janeiro.

In 2009, Silvio and Luiz started to write new material for the band’s second album, Reborn. For this new effort, some new friends were invited such as Flavio Pascarillo (drums) and Marcio Chicralla (bass). Leonardo Pagani (drums) & Alex Berger (guitar) also performed on this album joining Luiz, Silvio and Marcio on the live part of the CD since the band decided to re-record six songs from their early demo-tapes that will appear as bonus tracks on Reborn under the title “The 1985-87 Demo Tapes Revisited”. Reborn was released in December 2010 under the Portuguese record label “Metal Soldiers”, thanks to Fernando Roberto.

The band members are working on their third album.

Recordings

One More Battle

Track list:

 The Exorcist
 Going Down the Abyss
 The Animal
 Long Day Anxiety
 Insane Warrior
 Salvation Star
 A Touch of Reality
 When Faith Is Dying
 Survive
 Heaven Is Falling
 Sacttered Mind
 One More Battle

Reborn

Track list:

 Darkest Dreams
 Midnight Wanderer
 Bullets Flying
 Break Down the Walls
 Reborn
 Burn you Down
 Death of the Sun
 Judgement Day
 One Man Revolution
 Grey Skies
 Brand New Day
 Caes Maldidos
 Cruz de Ferro
 Tempo Fechado
 Insano
 Napalm
 O Exorcista

Personnel

 Silvio Mazzei (vocals)
 Luiz F. Machado (guitar)
 Marcio Chicralla (bass)
 Wallace Cardia (drums)
 Sidney Sohn (keyboards)

External links
 https://www.facebook.com/pages/Inquisi%C3%A7%C3%A3o/128762927193973*#!/pages/Inquisi%C3%A7%C3%A3o/128762927193973
 http://www.myspace.com/inquisicao

References

Brazilian heavy metal musical groups
Musical groups established in 1983
Musical groups disestablished in 1989
1983 establishments in Brazil
1989 disestablishments in Brazil
Musical groups reestablished in 2001
2001 establishments in Brazil